Venice High School may refer to:

 Venice High School (Los Angeles)
 Venice High School (Venice, Florida)